Martynas Arlauskas (born 10 July 2000) is a Lithuanian professional basketball player for Pieno žvaigždės Pasvalys of the Lithuanian Basketball League (LKL). He played college basketball for the Gonzaga Bulldogs.

Early career
Arlauskas played high school basketball with President Valdas Adamkus Gymnasium in Kaunas, Lithuania, as well as for the Žalgiris Kaunas first and second clubs. On September 20, 2018, he committed to play college basketball for Gonzaga, turning down professional options. He was ranked 42nd in his class by recruiting service 247Sports.

Career statistics

College

|-
| style="text-align:left;"| 2019–20
| style="text-align:left;"| Gonzaga
| 25 || 0 || 5.2 || .440 || .125 || .615 || .8 || .1 || .2 || .1 || 1.2
|-
| style="text-align:left;"| 2020–21
| style="text-align:left;"| Gonzaga
| 17 || 1 || 2.4 || .000 || .000 || .500 || .3 || .1 || .1 || .0 || .1
|-
| style="text-align:left;"| 2021–22
| style="text-align:left;"| Gonzaga
| 16 || 0 || 3.6 || .455 || .000 || .556 || .8 || .0 || .1 || .1 || .9
|- class="sortbottom"
| style="text-align:center;" colspan="2"| Career
| 58 || 1 || 3.9 || .400 || .125 || .577 || .7 || .1 || .1 || .1 || .8

References

External links
Gonzaga Bulldogs bio

2000 births
Living people
Basketball players from Kaunas
BC Žalgiris players
BC Žalgiris-2 players
Gonzaga Bulldogs men's basketball players
Lithuanian men's basketball players
Shooting guards
Small forwards